The striated caracara or Forster's caracara (Phalcoboenus australis) is a Near Threatened bird of prey of the family Falconidae, the falcons and caracaras. It is found in Argentina, Chile, and the Falkland Islands. In the Falklands it is known as the Johnny rook, probably named after the Johnny penguin (gentoo penguin).

Taxonomy and systematics
The striated caracara was formally described in 1788 by the German naturalist Johann Friedrich Gmelin in his revised and expanded edition of Carl Linnaeus's Systema Naturae. He placed it with the falcons and eagles in the genus Falco and coined the binomial name Falco australis. The specific epithet australis is Latin meaning "southern". Gmelin based his description on the "Statenland eagle" that had been described in 1781 by the English ornithologist John Latham in his A General Synopsis of Birds. Latham had obtained notes on the bird from the naturalist Johann Reinhold Forster. Johann Forster and his son Georg Forster had accompanied James Cook on his second voyage to the Pacific Ocean. The son Georg made a water-colour drawing of the striated caracara during their visit to Staten Island (east of Tierra del Fuego).The drawing is dated 3 January 1775 and is now held by the Natural History Museum in London. The striated caracara is now one of four species placed in the genus Phalcoboenus that was introduced in 1834 by Alcide d'Orbigny.

The taxonomy of the caracaras has not been settled. The American Ornithological Society and the International Ornithological Committee place the striated and three other caracaras in genus Phalcoboenus. BirdLife International's Handbook of the Birds of the World also places the striated caracara in Phalcoboenus, and includes four other caracaras. The Clements taxonomy places the striated and six other caracaras in genus Daptrius.

The taxonomic systems agree that the striated caracara is monotypic.

Description

The sexes' plumages are alike. Adults are mostly black to brownish back with white or tawny streaks on the upper back, neck, and breast. Their tail has a wide white tip, their underwing coverts and thighs are bright rusty rufous, and their primaries have white bases. The bare skin on their face is salmon pink to yellowish orange, their iris brown, and their legs and feet bright orange yellow. Juveniles are black to brownish black with a chestnut tail and gray bare parts; they gradually attain adult plumage and bare skin colors over their first five years.

The most common calls are "a cat-like wailing waa-aow, a high-pitched, repeated scream, a loud cawing kaa in face of human intruders, and short sharp clicks around nest."

Distribution and habitat

The striated caracara is found on the outer Falkland Islands, Isla Grande de Tierra del Fuego, Isla de los Estados (Staten Island), Isla Navarino, Cape Horn, and other islands in the far south of Argentina and Chile. It was hunted to extirpation on East Falkland. It is generally non-migratory but may move seasonally to the higher elevations. It also may be only a winter visitor to some of the South American islands.

Behavior

Feeding

The striated caracara is primarily a scavenger, feeding on carrion such as dead seabirds and sheep, offal, and food scraps around human settlements. Invertebrates are also part of their diet, including kelp fly larvae dug from intertidal kelp wrack, beetles, and earthworms dug from invasive grasses in hillside drainages. Striated caracaras will opportunistically prey on weak or injured animals, such as young seabirds and newborn lambs; the latter led to persecution by sheep farmers before a 1999 law forbid killing the species. Striated caracaras displace and rob other scavengers and small groups of will attack healthy birds as large as kelp geese (Chloephaga hybrida).

Breeding
On the Falkland Islands the striated caracara breeds between late October and January. Its nest is built of twigs and grass on the ground, under tussoc grass clumps, or on cliff ledges. The clutch size is usually two eggs but can be up to four. The incubation period, time to fledging, and details of parental care are not known.

Status

The IUCN has assessed the striated caracara as Near Threatened. It has a very limited range and an estimated population of under 2500 mature individuals, though the latter is believe to be stable. The predicted ecosystem stresses of climate change are the only known significant threat. The breeding population on the Falklands in 2006 was about 500 pairs, and 350 to 450 pairs may also be on the South American islands.

Gallery

References

External links

Falkland Islands Johnny Rooks Facebook research page
Carancho austral en Tierra del Fuego Facebook research page
Stamps issued for Falkland Islands

Further reading

striated caracara
striated caracara
Birds of the Falkland Islands
Birds of Tierra del Fuego
striated caracara
striated caracara